François Crépin (30 October 1830 – 30 April 1903) was an important botanist of the 19th century and director of the National Botanic Garden of Belgium.

Crépin was born in Rochefort, Belgium.  The genus Crepinella (Araliaceae) is named after him. As a taxonomist he circumscribed numerous plants within the genus Rosa. He died in Brussels.

His Belgian herbarium and his herbier des roses are kept in the collections of the Botanic Garden Meise.

Honours 
 1872: Corresponding member of the Royal Academy of Science, Letters and Fine Arts of Belgium; full membership in 1875.

Selected works 
 Les Characées de Belgique, 1863 – Characeae native to Belgium.
 La nomenclature botanique au congrès international de botanique de Paris, 1867 – Botanical nomenclature of the International Congress of Botany of Paris.
 Description de deux roses et observations sur la classification du genre Rosa, 1868.
 Manuel de la flore de Belgique, (fifth edition 1884) – Manual of Belgian flora.

References

External links
 

1830 births
1903 deaths
19th-century Belgian botanists
People from Rochefort, Belgium
Members of the Royal Academy of Belgium